The Golden Duck Awards for Excellence in Children's Science Fiction were given annually from 1992 to 2017.  The awards were presented every year at either Worldcon or the North American Science Fiction Convention (NASFiC).  In 2018 they were replaced by Notable Book Lists of the same names sponsored by the Library and Information Technology Association (LITA).

The Golden Duck Awards were funded by Super-Con-Duck-Tivity, Inc., the sponsor of the U.S. midwest regional science fiction convention DucKon.  Winners were selected by a group of teachers, librarians, parents, high tech workers and reviewers.

Categories
The categories are:
 Picture Book
 Middle Grades (the Eleanor Cameron Award)
 Young Adult (the Hal Clement Award)

There was also a provision for a Special Award if a book was found to be outstanding but did not fit any of the standard categories.

Golden Duck Award Winners

Picture Book
The picture book award is sometimes given to a book with non-fictional science content with a story "wrapper" as well as traditional Science Fiction themes.
 1992 – Time Train by Paul Fleischman, illustrated by Claire Ewart
 1993 – June 29, 1999 by David Wiesner
 1994 – Richie's Rocket by Joan Anderson, photographed by George Ancona
 1995 – Time Flies by Eric Rohmann
 1996 – Insects from Outer Space by Vladimir Vagin and Frank Asch
 1997 – Grandpa Takes Me to the Moon by Timothy Gaffney, illustrated by Barry Root
 1998 – Floating Home by David Getz, illustrated by Michael Rex
 1999 – Noah and the Space Ark by Laura Cecil, illustrated by Emma Chichester Clark
 2000 – Hush, Little Alien by Daniel Kirk
 2001 – Rex by Robert Gould and Kathleen Duey, illustrated by Eugene Epstein
 2002 – Baloney (Henry P.) by Jon Scieszka, illustrated by Lane Smith
 2003 – Incredible Cross-Sections of Star Wars, Episode II: Attack of the Clones by Curtis Saxton and Richard Chasemore
 2004 – Hazel Nutt, Mad Scientist by David Elliot, illustrated by True Kelley (Holliday House)
 2005 – Science Verse by Jon Scieszka, illustrated by Lane Smith (Viking)
 2006 – Captain Raptor and the Moon Mystery by Kevin O'Malley, illustrated by Patrick O'Brien
 2007 – Night of the Homework Zombies by Scott Nickel, illustrated by Steve Harpster
 2008 – Mars Needs Moms by Berkeley Breathed
 2009 – We're Off to Look for Aliens by Colin McNaughton
 2010 – Swamps of Sleethe by Jack Prelutsky
 2011 – Oh No! (Or, How My Science Project Destroyed the World) by Mac Barnett, illustrated by Dan Santat
 2012 – Earth to Clunk by Pam Smallcomb, illustrated by Joe Berger
 2013 – Oh No! Not Again!: (Or How I Built a Time Machine to Save History) (Or At Least My History Grade) by Mac Barnett, illustrated by Dan Santat
 2014 – Vader's Little Princess by Jeffrey Brown
 2015 – Max Goes to the Space Station by Jeffrey Bennett, illustrated by Michael Carroll
 2016 - Interstellar Cinderella, by Deborah Underwood, illustrated by Meg Hunt.
 2017 - Blip! written and illustrated by Barnaby Richards

Eleanor Cameron Award
This award is given to chapter books and middle grade novels.  The protagonists are science users and problem solvers.  Occasionally books with fantasy elements but a science fiction theme have won. 
 1992 – My Teacher Glows in the Dark by Bruce Coville
 1993 – Weirdos of the Universe Unite! by Pamela Service
 1994 – Worf's First Adventure by Peter David
 1995 – Shape Changer by Bill Brittain
 1996 – Star Hatchling by Margaret Bechard
 1997 – Kipton and the Tower of Time by Charles L. Fontenay
 1998 – The Andalite Chronicles by Katherine Applegate
 1999 – Young Jedi Knights series by Kevin J. Anderson and Rebecca Moesta
 2000 – I Was a Sixth Grade Alien by Bruce Coville
 2001 – The Power of Un by Nancy Etchemendy
 2002 – Beatnik Rutabagas from Beyond the Stars by Quentin Dodd
 2003 – Andrew Lost series: Andrew Lost on the Dog; Andrew Lost in the Bathroom; Andrew Lost in the Kitchen by J. C. Greenburg
 2004 – Escape from Memory by Margaret Peterson Haddix 
 2005 – The Supernaturalist by Eoin Colfer (Hyperion)
 2006 – (tie)
Whales on Stilts by M. T. Anderson, illustrated by Kurt Cyrus (Harcourt, 2005. )
The Fran That Time Forgot by Jim Benton (Aladdin)
 2007 – Apers by Mark Jansen with Barbara Day Zinicola (Dailey Swan Publishing, 2006)
 2008 – (tie)
Shanghaied to the Moon by Michael J. Daley
Gravity Buster: Journal #2 of a Cardboard Genius by Frank Asch
 2009 – Lighter than Air by Henry Melton
 2010 – Z Rex by Steve Cole
 2011 – Alien Encounter by Pamela Service and Mike Gorman
 2012 – Worst-Case Scenario Ultimate Adventure #2: Mars! by Hena Kahn and David Borgenicht
 2013 – Alien on a Rampage from the Intergalactic Bed and Breakfast series by Clete Barrett Smith
 2014 – Two books from the Galaxy Zack series: Hello, Nebulon! and Journey to Juno by Ray O'Ryan and Colin Jack
 2015 – Ambassador by William Alexander
 2016 - Fuzzy Mud, by Louis Sacher

Hal Clement Award
Hal Clement's own writings weren't YA, but his high school science teaching career strongly connects him to the YA age group.  The primary story elements are correct science with science fictional extrapolations and characters who solve problems on their own.
 1992 – Invitation to the Game by Monica Hughes
 1993 – River Rats by Caroline Stevermer
 1994 – The Giver by Lois Lowry
 1995 – The Ear, the Eye and the Arm by Nancy Farmer
 1996 – (tie)
The Winds of Mars by H. M. Hoover
The Night Room by E. M. Goldman
 1997 – Wildside by Steven Gould
 1998 – Shade's Children by Garth Nix
 1999 – Alien Dreams by Larry Segriff
 2000 – The Game of Worlds by Roger McBride Allen from David Brin's Out of Time series
 2001 – Jumping Off the Planet by David Gerrold
 2002 – This Side of Paradise by Steven Layne
 2003 – Feed by M.T. Anderson
 2004 – Gunpowder Empire by Harry Turtledove (Tor Books)
 2005 – Balance of Trade by Sharon Lee and Steve Miller (Meisha Merlin, 2004)
 2006 – Uglies by Scott Westerfeld (Simon Pulse)
 2007 – Rash by Pete Hautman (Simon & Schuster, 2006)
 2008 – Sky Horizon by David Brin and illustrated by Scott Hampton (Subterranean Press, 2007)
 2009 – (tie)
The Hunger Games by Suzanne Collins (Scholastic Press, 2008)
Little Brother by Cory Doctorow (Doherty, Tom Associates, LLC, 2008)
 2010 – Catching Fire by Suzanne Collins
 2011 – WWW: Watch by Robert J. Sawyer
 2012 – (tie)
 A Beautiful Friendship by David Weber
 A Long, Long Sleep by Anna Sheehan
 2013 – Cinder by Marissa Meyer
 2014 – The Planet Thieves by Dan Krokos
 2015 – Expiration Day by William Campbell Powell
 2016 - Armada, by Ernest Cline

Special Awards
 1997 Strong Female Characters – Kipton and the Android by Charles L. Fontenay (Royal Fireworks Press, 1996)
 1999 Australian Contribution to Children's Science Fiction – Garth Nix
 2000 Promotion of Reading – Harry Potter series by J. K. Rowling
 2003 Best Science and Technology Education – Tales from the Wonder Zone (entire series) by Julie E. Czerneda (Trifolium Books)
 2007 Nonfiction – Write Your Own Science Fiction Story by Tish Farrell (Compass Point Books, 2006)
 2008 Nonfiction – World of Science Fiction – 12 titles by John Hamilton (ABDO Publishing Company)
 + Stone Arch Books for publishing quality science fiction graphic novels
 2010 Nonfiction – You Write It: Science Fiction by John Hamilton (ABDO Publishing Company)

External links

Science Fiction Awards Database listings for the Golden Duck Awards
LITA Excellence in Children’s and Young Adult Science Fiction Notable Lists

Science fiction awards
American children's literary awards
Awards established in 1992